Live at Grimey's is a live album by the American heavy metal band Metallica. The album was recorded live on June 12, 2008, at The Basement, a venue beneath Grimey's New & Preloved Music in Nashville, Tennessee, just before their appearance at the Bonnaroo Music Festival. It was released on November 26, 2010. It was released on both CD and vinyl, and is available at independent record stores, as well as the band's website. In its first week after release, the album sold around 3,000 copies.

As opposed to all of Metallica releases from Death Magnetic onwards, Live at Grimey's is its first release since the band's live album S&M (1999) to use the original Metallica logo rather than the more slanted one used for Death Magnetic.

Track listing

Personnel
 James Hetfield – lead vocals, rhythm guitar
 Kirk Hammett – lead guitar, backing vocals
 Robert Trujillo – bass, backing vocals
 Lars Ulrich – drums

References

Metallica live albums
2010 live albums
Warner Records live albums
Live thrash metal albums